Robison Glacier is a broad tributary glacier flowing northwest along the north side of La Gorce Mountains to enter Scott Glacier, in the Queen Maud Mountains. It was discovered in December 1934 by the Byrd Antarctic Expedition geological party under Quin Blackburn, and was named by the Advisory Committee on Antarctic Names (US-ACAN) for Lieutenant Commander Layton E. Robison, a pilot with U.S. Navy Squadron VX-6 during Operation Deep Freeze 1964, 1965 and 1966.

References

Glaciers of Marie Byrd Land